The Tournament for Bolesław Chrobry Crown - First King of Poland is an annual motorcycle speedway event organized by the Start Gniezno, which is a motorcycle speedway team. The tournament is held each year in the Start Gniezno Stadium in Gniezno, Poland (the first capital of Poland). The tournament is named after Bolesław I the Brave, the first King of Poland (1025), who previously ruled as Duke of Poland (992-1025).

Podium

See also 
 motorcycle speedway
 Start Gniezno

External links 
 (Polish) Official webside

 
Crown
Speedway